Not 4 Sale is the thirteenth studio album by Sammy Hagar, and the second album by Hagar's backup band The Waboritas. As it was released in the US on Hagar's own Cabo Wabo Music label, problems arose with distribution; the release date passed without copies being delivered to several national retail chains.

It peaked at #11 on the Billboard Independent Albums chart.

Song information
"Stand Up" was originally written by Hagar for the film Rock Star. It appears here with new lyrics.
The studio version of "Hallelujah" is included as the only studio track on Live: Hallelujah. Hagar wanted to give the song another commercial chance since the Not 4 Sale release was plagued with distribution problems.
"Halfway to Memphis" was later re-recorded as a country song for the Livin' It Up! album.
"Whole Lotta Zep" is a re-working/medley of three Led Zeppelin songs: "Whole Lotta Love," "Black Dog," and "Kashmir."

Critical reception
AllMusic wrote: "With quite a few rock veterans trying to update their sound with modern touches and failing miserably come the early 21st century, Hagar wisely sticks to his bread and butter on Not 4 Sale."

Track listing

Personnel
Sammy Hagar: lead vocals, guitar
Victor Johnson: guitar
Jesse Harms: keyboards
Mona Gnader: bass guitar
David Lauser: drums, co-lead vocals on "The Big Square Inch"

Singles
"Things've Changed" (US)

Versions
33rd Street Records (US): 33RD ST 3315
33rd Street Records (Russia): M3-II/75/2002
Cabo Wabo Music/Pony Canyon Inc (Japan): PCCY-01674

References

External links
 Lyrics from Hagar's official web site 

Sammy Hagar albums
2002 albums